Wilno Voivodeship may refer to:

Vilnius Voivodeship, one of the historic voivodeships of the Grand Duchy of Lithuania, established in 1413
Wilno Voivodeship (1926–1939), voivodeship of Poland from 1926 to 1939

it:Voivodato di Vilnius
pt:Voivodia de Wilno